North Down Borough Council was a Local Council in County Down in Northern Ireland. It merged with Ards Borough Council in May 2015 under local government reorganisation in Northern Ireland to become North Down and Ards District Council.

Its main town was Bangor, 12 miles east of Belfast with a population of approximately 68,000.  The Council was headquartered in Bangor. Its secondary centre was the former Urban District of Holywood, 8 km northeast of Belfast with a population of approximately 10,000. Most of the remainder of a total population was in suburban villages along the southern shore of Belfast Lough. The area of the former Borough is heavily suburbanised, railway links with Belfast are good and the area has been the domain of Belfast commuters since the mid-19th century. The former Borough is often held to be the wealthiest area in Northern Ireland, although there are pockets of deprivation in a string of overspill public housing estates along the Bangor Ring Road.

The borough consisted of 4 electoral areas: Abbey, Ballyholme and Groomsport, Bangor West and Holywood. In the 2011 election, 25 members were elected from the following political parties: 11 Democratic Unionist Party, 6 Alliance, 4 Ulster Unionists, 1 Green, and 2 Independents.
North Down along with Carrickfergus Borough Council were the only councils in Northern Ireland without Nationalist political party representation.

The Borough of North Down was formed in 1973 in the local government reorganisation from the old Bangor Urban District, Holywood Urban District, North Down Rural District and part of Castlereagh Rural District.

In elections for the Westminster Parliament it was part of the slightly larger North Down constituency.

See Also: Districts of Northern Ireland

Summary of seats won 1973–2011

† Others include Ann Marie Hillen, who stood under the label Better Bangor Campaign in 1989, having been elected earlier that year in a by-election. Of the candidates elected in 1993, Jimmy White was elected as a Holywood Pool Campaigner and another as Action '93. Alan Chambers, elected at every election from 1993 to 2011, has usually been described on the ballot paper as an Independent, but describes himself on the council website as an Independent Unionist and stood under that label in 1997. He is tallied as Independent Unionist above for all elections.

2011 Election results

Mayor

Review of Public Administration
Under the Review of Public Administration (RPA) the Council was due to merge with Ards in 2011 to form a single council for the enlarged area totalling 451 km² and a population of 149,567. The next election was due to take place in May 2009, but on 25 April 2008, Shaun Woodward, Secretary of State for Northern Ireland announced that the scheduled 2009 district council elections were to be postponed until the introduction of the eleven new councils in 2011. It took place in 2015.

Population
The area covered by North Down Borough Council had a population of 78,937 residents according to the 2011 Northern Ireland census.

References

External links
Bangor, County Down

Politics of County Down
Bangor, County Down
District councils of Northern Ireland, 1973–2015
Boroughs of Northern Ireland